Fresnosaurus is an extinct genus of plesiosaur from the Late Cretaceous (Maastrichtian stage) of what is now California. The type species is Fresnosaurus drescheri, first described by Welles in 1943. The generic name Fresnosaurus honors Fresno County, while the specific name honors Arthur Drescher.

Fresnosaurus was probably at least 9 meters (30 feet) in length. Like all elasmosaurid plesiosaurs, it probably ate small bony fish, belemnites, and ammonites.

See also

 List of plesiosaur genera
 Timeline of plesiosaur research

References

Late Cretaceous plesiosaurs of North America
Fossil taxa described in 1943
Elasmosaurids
Taxa named by Samuel Paul Welles
Sauropterygian genera